Joll is a surname. It may refer to:

 Christopher Joll (born 1948), British military event director and author
 Ernst Joll (1902–1935), Estonian professional journalist and footballer
 James Joll (1918–1994), British historian and university lecturer
 Philip Joll (born 1954), Welsh operatic baritone